"M・A・D" is the fifth single released by the Japanese rock band Buck Tick, released on June 5, 1991. It is labeled with Victor Entertainment. It appeared 5 times in the Oricon Chart.

Track listing

Musicians

Atsushi Sakurai: Voice
Hisashi Imai: Guitar
Hidehiko Hoshino: Guitar
Yutaka Higuchi: Bass
Toll Yagami: Drums

References

External links
 

1991 singles
Buck-Tick songs
1991 songs
Victor Entertainment singles
Songs with lyrics by Atsushi Sakurai
Songs with music by Hisashi Imai